Ainara Sanz (born 15 January 1995) is a Spanish professional racing cyclist. She rides for team Bizkaia–Durango.

See also
 List of 2015 UCI Women's Teams and riders

References

External links

1995 births
Living people
Spanish female cyclists
Place of birth missing (living people)
Sportspeople from Vitoria-Gasteiz
Cyclists from the Basque Country (autonomous community)
21st-century Spanish women